The 13th Annual International Emmy Awards took place on November 25, 1985, in New York City, United States. The awards were presented by the International Council of the National Academy of Television Arts and Sciences.

Ceremony 
The Renowned producer David Attenborough and ABC Board Chairman Leonard Goldenson received special awards, while programs from the UK won four of the five categories at the 13th Annual International Emmy Awards.

Only Das Boot, the German program which was nominated for six Oscars, broke the British dominations of the awards. Das Boot won as Outstanding drama series.

Attenborough was presented the Founder's Award. The award has been presented only five times in 13 years. Goldenson received the Directorate "for lifetime of dedication to the pursuit of excelence in broadcasting."

In addition to Das Boot, the winners in documentary category was 28 Up, and Omnibus: The Treble, in category performing arts. The winners were selected from 166 entries from 22 countries.

Winners

Children & Young People 
 Supergran (Great Britain: Tyne Tees Television)

Documentary 
 28 Up (Great Britain: Granada Television)

Drama Series 
 Das Boot (Germany)

Performing Arts 
 Omnibus: The Treble (Great Britain: British Broadcasting Corporation)

Popular Arts 
 Spitting Image (Great Britain: Central Independent TV)

References 

International Emmy Awards ceremonies
International
International